Palminópolis is a municipality in eastern Goiás state, Brazil.

Location
Nearby towns are Palmeiras de Goiás, 28 km. to the east, and Turvânia, 22 km. to the north.  The Turvo River lies to the west.
 
Distance to regional center (São Luís de Montes Belos):  41 km.
Highway connections from Goiânia:  state highway BR-069 west from Goiânia, through Trindade / GO-050 / Campestre de Goiás / GO-156. 
Neighboring municipalities:  São João da Paraúna, Palmeiras de Goiás, Jandaia, Paraúna and Turvânia

Political Information
Mayor: Erisval Vicente Santana (January 2005)
City council: 9
Eligible voters:  3,294 (December 2007)

Demographic Information
Population density: 9.34 inhabitants/km2 (2007)
Urban population: 2,421 (2007)
Rural population: 1,201 (2007)
Population growth: a loss of about 800 people since 1980

Economic Information
The economy is based on agriculture, cattle raising, services, public administration, and small transformation industry.  There is one dairy and one meat packing plant (frigorífico).  
Industrial units: 6 ( June 2007)
Commercial units: 37 ( August 2007)
Dairy: Indústria e Comércio de Laticínios Saltador Ltda. (22/05/2006)
Meat-packing plant: Coop. Agrop. dos Prod. Organ. do Estado de Goiás. (22/05/2006)
Motor vehicles: 361 automobiles and pickup trucks (2007), which gave a ratio of 10 inhabitants for each motor vehicle.  
Cattle herd: 48,660 head
Main crops: rice, rubber, corn, soybeans (800 hectares), and tomatoes.
Number of farms: 423
Agricultural area: 44,756
Planted area: 4,100 ha.
Area of natural pasture: 33,678 ha. 
Persons employed in agriculture: 2,120

Education (2006)
Schools: 4 with 1,018 students
Higher education: none
Adult literacy rate: 87.9% (2000) (national average was 86.4%)

Health (2007)
Hospitals: 1
Hospital beds: 20
Ambulatory clinics: 3
Infant mortality rate: 22.64 (2000) (national average was 33.0)

Ranking on the Municipal Human Development Index
MHDI:  0.753
State ranking:  70 (out of 242 municipalities)
National ranking:  1,797 (out of 5,507 municipalities)

Data are from 2000.  For the complete list see Frigoletto.com

History
Palminópolis began in 1949 when lands belong to a cattle ranch were distributed to make lots.  The first settlement was called São Bento, which was later changed to Palminópolis due to the proximity of Palmeiras de Goiás.  In 1953 it became a district of Palmeiras de Goiás, separating in 1961 to become a municipality.

See also
List of municipalities in Goiás
Microregions of Goiás

References

Frigoletto

Municipalities in Goiás